Paradoryphoribius is an extinct genus of tardigrades from the order Parachela. It is the third fossil tardigrade to be named, described in 2021 from Miocene Dominican amber from the Dominican Republic. The type, and currently only species, is P. chronocaribbeus. Paradoryphoribius is the first extinct tardigrade known from the Cenozoic and is also the first tardigrade known from the Miocene. It has a length of 539 microns.

References 

Fossil taxa described in 2021
Tardigrade genera
Parachaela

Dominican amber